Kristen Gislefoss (born 2 May 1954) is a Norwegian meteorologist and weather presenter.

He was born in Vennesla, took his secondary education at Kristiansand Cathedral School and the cand.real. degree at the University of Bergen in 1980. He then took the teachers' seminary before being hired in the Norwegian Meteorological Institute in 1981. In 1990 he became a prime time weather presenter for the Norwegian Broadcasting Corporation.

He resides at Grav and is the father of meteorologist and weather presenter Kristian Gislefoss.

References

1954 births
Living people
People from Vennesla
People educated at Kristiansand Cathedral School
University of Bergen alumni
Norwegian meteorologists
Weather presenters
NRK people